Mohamad Al Hasan (born January 21, 1988 in Manbij, Syria) is a Syrian football player who is currently playing for Al-Wahda in the Syrian Premier League.

Honour and Titles

Club 
Al-Ittihad
 Syrian Cup: 2011
 AFC Cup: 2010

References

External links
stats at Kooora.com (Arabic)

1988 births
Living people
Syrian footballers
Syria international footballers
Syrian expatriate footballers
Syrian expatriate sportspeople in Iraq
Expatriate footballers in Iraq
Expatriate footballers in Thailand
Syrian expatriate sportspeople in Thailand
Association football midfielders
Al-Ittihad Aleppo players
AFC Cup winning players
Syrian Premier League players